Tadbir  is a 1945 Indian Hindi language film. It was the fifth-highest-grossing Indian film of 1945. The film was directed by Jayant Desai under his Jayan Desai Productions banner and had music composed by Lal Mohammed, with lyrics written by Swami Ramanand Saraswati. The film starred K. L. Saigal, Suraiya, Mubarak, Jillobai, Rehana and Shashi Kapoor.

Cast
 K. L. Saigal as Kanhaiyalal
 Suraiya as Saguna
 Mubarak as Jwalaprasad
 Jilloo
 Rehana
 Rewashankar Marwadi
 Raja Rani 
 Shashiraj
 Ameena
 Shalini
 Gharpure 
 Raja Joshi

References

External links
 

1945 films
1940s Hindi-language films
Indian drama films
1945 drama films
Indian black-and-white films
Films directed by Jayant Desai
Hindi-language drama films